The 2010 FIM British Speedway Grand Prix was the six race of the 2010 Speedway Grand Prix season. It took place on 10 July at the Millennium Stadium in Cardiff, Great Britain.

The British Grand Prix was won by Australian Chris Holder, who beat World Champion Jason Crump, Pole Jarosław Hampel and Dane Hans Andersen in the Final. It was first ever Holder' GP winning.

Riders 
The Speedway Grand Prix Commission nominated Scott Nicholls as Wild Card, and Ben Barker and Daniel King both as Track Reserves. Injured Emil Sayfutdinov was replaced by second Qualified Substitutes Davey Watt. The Draw was made on 9 July at 13:00 CEST by four-time World Champion Barry Briggs of New Zealand.
 (3)  Emil Sayfutdinov → (20)  Davey Watt

Heat details

Heat after heat 
 Holder, Holta, Gollob, Pedersen
 Hancock, Zetterström, Jonsson, Woffinden
 Crump, Lindgren, Andersen, Bjerre
 Hampel, Harris, Nicholls, Watt
 Watt, Holta, Bjerre, Zetterström
 Hampel, Holder, Lindgren, Woffinden
 Crump, Harris, Pedersen, Hancock
 Gollob, Nicholls, Andersen, Jonsson
 Crump, Woffinden, Nicholls, Holta
 Andersen, Holder, Zetterström, Harris
 Pedersen, Hampel, Bjerre, Jonsson
 Lindgren, Gollob, Hancock, Watt
 Hampel, Hancock, Andersen, Holta
 Watt, Crump, Holder, Jonsson
 Lindgren, Pedersen, Zetterström, Nicholls
 Gollob, Bjerre, Woffinden, Harris
 Holta, Harris, Jonsson, Lindgren
 Bjerre, Holder, Hancock, Nicholls
 Woffinden, Andersen, Pedersen, Watt (F3x)
 Gollob, Zetterström, Hampel, Crump
 Semi-Finals
 Holder, Andersen, Holta, Gollob (R)
 Hampel, Crump, Lindgren, Pedersen
 The Final
 Holder, Crump, Hampel, Andersen

The intermediate classification

See also 
 motorcycle speedway

References 

Great Britain
2010
Speedway Grand Prix of Great Britain 2010
Speedway Grand Prix
2010 in Welsh sport
2010s in Cardiff